Kianz González-Froese (born April 16, 1996) is a Canadian soccer player who plays for 3. Liga side Wehen Wiesbaden.

Club career

Vancouver Whitecaps
With a father from Saskatchewan and a mother from Cuba, Kianz grew up playing soccer in both Winnipeg, Manitoba, Canada, and Havana, Cuba.

Froese began his career with the Vancouver Whitecaps FC Residency program in 2012. He made 23 appearances in the 2012–13 season and recorded three goals. He also spent the 2012 season with Vancouver Whitecaps FC U-23 in the USL Premier Development League.

Froese made his first team debut with Vancouver Whitecaps FC in a 2–1 defeat to Toronto FC in the first leg of the Canadian Championship semifinals. On September 14, 2014, he officially signed with Vancouver as a Homegrown Player. He made his MLS regular season debut for the Whitecaps against the Seattle Sounders FC on October 10.

He scored his first MLS goal against the New York Red Bulls on June 20, 2015. Froese scored his second goal for Vancouver in a 1–0 home win against Honduran side Olimpia in the CONCACAF Champions League.

Fortuna Düsseldorf
Froese was sold to Fortuna Düsseldorf in February 2017. He signed a first-team deal in December 2017. After 2.5 years with Fortuna Düsseldorf II, Froese left the club at the end of the 2018–19 season.

1. FC Saarbrücken
On July 12, 2019, Froese signed with Regionalliga side 1. FC Saarbrücken. At the end of the 2019–20 Regionalliga campaign, Saarbrücken clinched promotion to the 3. Liga. In May 2021 it was announced Froese would be departing Saarbrücken at the end of their season.

TSV Havelse
On August 17, 2021, Froese was signed by 3. Liga side TSV Havelse.

Wehen Wiesbaden
In June 2022, Froese would sign with fellow 3. Liga side Wehen Wiesbaden on a 2 year contract.

International career
Froese represented his country of birth, Cuba, at the 2011 CONCACAF U-17 Championship. However, in April 2012 he switched his allegiance to Canada. On October 3, 2013, he was named to Canada's under-17 squad for the 2013 FIFA U-17 World Cup.  He made three appearances during the tournament.  He was also called into Canadian national team camp on January 10, 2014. In the summer of 2014, Froese joined the U-20s for the 2014 Milk Cup. In January 2015, Froese was named to the Canadian squad that would participate at the 2015 CONCACAF U-20 Championship. He scored a goal against El Salvador in a 3–2 loss during the tournament.

Froese received his first cap for the senior side against Ghana on October 14, 2015.

Career statistics

Club

References

External links

1996 births
Living people
Association football midfielders
Citizens of Canada through descent
Canadian soccer players
Cuban footballers
Sportspeople from Havana
Soccer players from Winnipeg
Cuban people of Canadian descent
Canadian people of Cuban descent
Canadian expatriate soccer players
Cuban expatriate footballers
Expatriate footballers in Germany
Canadian expatriate sportspeople in Germany
Cuban expatriate sportspeople in Germany
Vancouver Whitecaps FC U-23 players
Vancouver Whitecaps FC players
Whitecaps FC 2 players
Fortuna Düsseldorf players
Fortuna Düsseldorf II players
1. FC Saarbrücken players
TSV Havelse players
SV Wehen Wiesbaden players
USL League Two players
Major League Soccer players
USL Championship players
Regionalliga players
3. Liga players
Cuba youth international footballers
Canada men's youth international soccer players
Canada men's international soccer players
2015 CONCACAF U-20 Championship players
Homegrown Players (MLS)